The Sukhoi Superjet 100 or SSJ100 is a regional jet designed by Russian aircraft company Sukhoi Civil Aircraft, a division of the United Aircraft Corporation (now: Regional Aircraft – Branch of the Irkut Corporation). With development starting in 2000, it made its maiden flight on 19 May 2008 and its first commercial flight on 21 April 2011 with Armavia.

The  MTOW plane typically seats 87 to 98 passengers and is powered by two  PowerJet SaM146 turbofans developed by a joint venture between French Safran and Russian NPO Saturn.  By May 2018, 127 were in service and by September the fleet had logged 300,000 revenue flights and 460,000 hours. By November 2021 fleet had logged at least 2,000,000 hours. The plane has recorded three hull loss accidents and 86 deaths . In 2022, Sukhoi plans a Russified version of the body and electronic, without most of the Western components, the engine will also be replaced, using Aviadvigatel PD-8. Aeroflot has ordered 89 Irkut SSJ-Russified aircraft.

Development

Background 
JSC Sukhoi was incorporated in May 2000 to develop the first all-new commercial aircraft in post-Soviet Russia.
Studies of the Russian Regional Jet (RRJ) began in 2001. Three variants were initially envisaged: the RRJ60, RRJ75 and RRJ95, with 60, 78 and 98 seats respectively; a five-abreast layout was chosen as being optimal for this size range. Sukhoi estimated the targeted market to be around 800 aircraft, including 250–300 from Russia and the Commonwealth of Independent States.

On 15 October 2001, the Russian government allocated $46.6 million to the development of a new 70–80 seat regional jet, targeting first flight in 2006 and entry into service in 2007.
Sukhoi's RRJ was competing against Myasishchev's M-60-70 and Tupolev's Tu-414 projects. Boeing provided advice to Sukhoi and its partners on programme management, engineering, marketing, product development, certification, supplier management and customer support. The Sukhoi RRJ was selected by Rosaviakosmos, the government's aviation and space agency, in March 2003.

The RRJ programme allocated $63.5 million to the development of a  engine between 2003 and 2015. Four engines were initially envisaged: the Pratt & Whitney PW800, the Rolls-Royce BR710, the General Electric CF34-8, and the Snecma/NPO Saturn SaM146.
The BR710 and the CF34-8 were eliminated by July 2002, and the PW800 was subsequently rejected due to a perceived technical risk associated with its geared fan.
A formal memorandum of understanding was signed with Snecma on 29 April 2003, confirming the selection of the  SaM146,
to be developed in a joint venture with NPO Saturn, based on the Snecma SPW14 and combining a Snecma DEM21 gas generator with an Aviadvigatel "cold section".

Key suppliers were selected in October 2003, including Thales for avionics, Messier-Bugatti-Dowty for landing gear, Honeywell for the auxiliary power unit, Liebherr for flight controls, Intertechnique for fuel systems, Parker Hannifin for hydraulic systems, B/E Aerospace for interiors.
At this time, Sukhoi anticipated a market for 600 aircraft by 2020representing 10% of global demand for regional jetsfor a total sales volume of $11 billion.
Discussions were held with Air France and the SkyTeam alliance to ensure that the aircraft would meet western requirements.
An application for EASA certification was made in 2004 and was expected to be granted six months after the Russian approval.

The Komsomolsk-on-Amur plant was selected in February 2005 for final assembly, implementing jig-less assembly, automatic component alignment and automatic riveting.
The RRJ60 and RRJ75 were deemed to be less cost-effective, and development was focused on the largest model, the 98-seat RRJ95. The 78-seater RRJ75 remained under consideration, and a future stretch was also envisaged.
The RRJ95 was renamed the Sukhoi Superjet 100 at the Farnborough Air Show in July 2005.
The first order, for 30 aircraft, was signed on 7 December with Aeroflot.

In June 2007, Boeing expanded its assistance to cover flight and maintenance crew training and manuals, and spare parts management and supply. On 22 August, Sukhoi and Alenia Aeronautica established the SuperJet International joint venture for customer support outside Russia and Asia. Alenia Aeronautica took a 25% stake in Sukhoi Civil Aircraft Corporation (SCAC) for $250 million, valuing it at $1 billion.
Development costs were expected to total $1 billion, with another $1 billion needed to develop the powerplant and for customer support.

Flight testing 

The first SSJ was transported in an Antonov 124 from Komsomolsk-on-Amur to Zhukovsky, Moscow Oblast on 28 January 2007, for ground tests conducted by the Central Aerohydrodynamic Institute (TsAGI). The SuperJet was officially unveiled on 26 September 2007 at Dzyomgi Airport in Komsomolsk-on-Amur. By October 2007, initial deliveries were scheduled for 2009; plans called for the 95–98-seat model to be followed by a 75–78-seat shrink and a 110-seat stretch.

The SaM146 engine was first run on 21 February 2008. Tests were conducted by the Gromov Flight Research Institute, using an Ilyushin Il-76LL as a flying test bed. The SuperJet 100 made its maiden flight on 19 May 2008, taking off from Komsomolsk-on-Amur. By July, certification was expected for the third quarter of 2009, pushing back deliveries to later the same quarter.
On 24 December 2008, the second SSJ made its maiden flight.

By January 2009, the first two aircraft had completed over 80 flights, and the engines had accumulated 2,300 hours of tests. In April 2009, the two prototypes were flown  from Novosibirsk to Moscow, and EASA pilots conducted a number of familiarisation flights. A third prototype joined the test campaign in July 2009.

The SSJ made its international debut at the 2009 Paris Air Show; during the show, Malév Hungarian Airlines placed a $1 billion order for 30 aircraft.
As of June 2009, 13 aircraft were under construction, with the first four scheduled to be handed over to clients from December.  Armenian Armavia was to receive the first two, followed by Aeroflot, having ordered 30 with an option for 15 more. Other customers include Russian Avialeasing, Swiss AMA Asset Management Advisor, and Indonesian Kartika Airlines. Sukhoi expected production to reach a rate of 70 aircraft per year by 2012.

In December 2009, engine availability issues resulted in deliveries being delayed indefinitely. On 4 February 2010, the fourth prototype made its maiden flight using engines removed from the first prototype, as a result of continuing delays in engine production, including NPO Saturn quality problems.
On 15 September 2010, static tests for certification of the aircraft were completed by TsAGI.

Certification 

By June 2010, certification was 90% complete but was delayed due to SaM146 engine problems that were not encountered during testing.
In September 2010, certification was expected for November. In October 2010, noise was tested for certification authorities, Russian IAC and European EASA. On 4 November 2010, the first production aircraft, intended for Armavia, was first flown.
By November 2010, the SSJ test fleet had made 948 flights totalling 2,245 hours.

On 3 February 2011, IAC granted a Type Certificate.
EASA's Type Certificate followed on 3 February 2012, allowing operations in European countries.

On 14 March 2022, EASA revoked the Superjet's airworthiness certificate as part of the EU's sanctions against Russia following the Russian invasion of Ukraine.

In service developments 

London City Airport is a major destination for Irish airline CityJet, which was to receive 15 SSJ100s, but its steep 5.5° approach required new control laws, wing flap setting and modified brakes: test flights were to begin in December 2017, with certification planned for 2018, and the modified aircraft to be available in 2019.

A new "sabrelet" winglet, helping takeoff and landing performance and delivering 3% better fuel burn, will be standard and available for retrofit.
Designed with CFD tools by Sukhoi and TsAGI, the "saberlets" debuted flight tests on 21 December 2017.
They should improve hot and high airport performance and cut costs up to $70,000 per year.
Parts of the wing are reinforced for the aerodynamic loads distribution change.
They should reduce fuel costs by 4%, flight-testing was completed after over 140 flights by October 2019.
The first aircraft with the composite winglets was delivered to Russian carrier Severstal Aircompany in December 2019.

By November 2018, the TsAGI carried out wind tunnel tests on two modified wing designs to save structural weight: one with less wing sweep and the other with more relative thickness, also enhancing aerodynamics and load capabilities, and improving fuel efficiency by nearly 10%.

Russified SSJ 

To resist the Airbus–Boeing duopoly pressure on regional jets through the Embraer E-Jet E2 and the Airbus A220, Sukhoi would upgrade the SSJ100 to the SSJ100B and the "Russianised" SSJ100R. Western content accounts for 55–60% of the original SSJ100's cost but sanctions against Russia are tightening. As of December 2018, the US authorities did not send any feedback to Sukhoi over exports to Iran. The SSJ100B would feature more powerful SaM146-1S18 engines, improved avionics software, enhanced high-lift devices controls and retrofittable "sabrelet" blended wingtip devices. After 2021 the SSJ100R would replace western components by Russian ones for government customers and countries subject to Western sanctions such as Iran Air Tours and Iran Aseman.

SSJ100R could include a smaller variant of the Aviadvigatel PD-14 engine (Aviadvigatel PD-8); KRET electronic units to replace the Thales avionics; a Russian inertial navigation system and APU to replace Honeywell's; and the landing gear to replace one produced by Safran. Fuel burn would be reduced by 5–8% with a new composite wing. Russian content should double to 30% as US restrictions limit its export potential. Sukhoi forecasts 345 sales from 2018 to 2030, mostly in post-Soviet states and some in south-east Asia and Latin America, including an improved range business jet version. The seating capacity is to be raised to 110, and hot and high operations to 4000 m and 50 °C. A freighter variant is also being studied. Russian government has earmarked ₽3.2 billion ($51 million) toward the variant of the SSJ with indigenous propulsion and avionics, introduced at the Eurasia Airshow 2018 in Antalya alongside the SSJ75.

In May 2021, Rostec announced the completion of the first experimental core 'hot section' of the PD-8 engine. The 'Russified' variant of the SSJ with the composite wing, indigenous avionics and the PD-8 engine later became known as the SSJ-New. In July 2021, UEC exhibited the new engine at the 2021 Moscow Air Show and aimed to secure type certification by 2023. In January 2022, a new control system, developed by UEC for the PD-8 engine, was being tested prior to integration with the engine.
The full domestic fabrications plan will take place in 2023 to 2024, replacing Western components.

Under a plan announced in June 2022 to bring the proportion of domestically produced aircraft to 80% of the Russian fleet by the end of the decade following the international sanctions brought in after the 2022 Russian invasion of Ukraine, serial production of the SSJ-New was expected to begin in 2023. In July 2022, a prototype SSJ-New fuselage was transported to test facilities near Moscow to undergo life cycle testing.

Irkut Corporation integration 
At the end of November 2018, United Aircraft Corporation transferred  from Sukhoi to the Irkut Corporation, to become UAC's airliner division, as Leonardo S.p.A. pulled out in early 2017 because of Superjet's poor financial performance. Irkut will manage the Superjet 100, the MC-21 and the Russo-Chinese CR929 widebody, but the Il-114 passenger turboprop and modernized Ilyushin Il-96-400 widebody will stay with Ilyushin. The new commercial division will also include the Yakovlev Design Bureau, avionics specialist UAC—Integration Center and composite manufacturer AeroComposit. The aircraft is to be known simply as the Superjet 100, dropping the Sukhoi name.

Potential sale of SuperJet International
In March 2023, a possible deal was announced that would see UAC sell its stake in SuperJet International (SJI) to an Emirati investment fund, Markab Capital Investments. A new factory would be built at Al Ain International Airport, Abu Dhabi, where aircraft would be assembled before completion at SJI's Venice site. The deal would be conditional on SJI's assets being unfrozen by the European Union. It is unclear how Russian production of the SSJ-New would be affected by the deal, or how the new owners would establish a supply chain for the aircraft.

Design 

The five-abreast cross-section is more optimised beyond 70 seats than the four-abreast Bombardier CRJs and Embraer E-Jets but smaller than the six-abreast Airbus A320 and Boeing 737.
The SSJ100 typically seats 87 to 98 passengers. In Russia, it replaces the aging Tupolev Tu-134 and Yakovlev Yak-42 aircraft. It competes with the Antonov An-148, Embraer E190 and the Bombardier CRJ1000. Sukhoi claims cash operational costs are lower than competitors by 8-10%, with reduced fuel burn per seat and longer maintenance intervals.

The design meets CIS AP-25, US FAR-25 and EU JAR-25 aviation rules, and conforms to ICAO Chapter 4 and FAR 36 Section 4 noise standards from 2006.
The PowerJet SaM146 turbofans provides  of thrust for 70–120 seat aircraft.

The Russian Ministry of Industry and Trade supports it as a priority project. In 2010, development costs were $1.4 billion excluding the SaM146 engine, with 25% funded from the federal budget, rising to US$ 1.5 billion by 2013. Unit cost was US$31–35 million in 2012, rising to a US$50.1 million base price in 2018.

Over 30 foreign partnerships are involved. The SaM146 engines are developed, manufactured and marketed by PowerJet, a joint-venture between the French Snecma and Russia's NPO Saturn. Assembly is performed at the Komsomolsk-on-Amur Aircraft Plant in the Russian Far East, while the Novosibirsk Aircraft Production Association produces components; both are upgrading their facilities and were expecting to produce 70 airframes by 2012.

Operational history

Introduction 

On 19 April 2011, the first production aircraft was handed over to Armavia at Zvartnots Airport in Yerevan, to be operated to Moscow and Sochi, as well as Ukrainian cities. The aircraft was named after Yuri Gagarin.
On 21 April, the first commercial flight landed at Moscow Sheremetyevo, lasting 2 h 55 min; Armavia used the Airbus A319 on this route before switching to the Superjet 100.
On 1 May, it made its first commercial flight to Venice Airport in around 4 hours, it had accumulated 50 hours in 24 flights by then.

By March 2012, the six aircraft operated by Aeroflot were flying 3.9 hours/day instead of the standard 8–9 hours due to failures and parts delivery delays, and the airline asked for compensation.
In August 2012, Armavia announced that it had returned both of its SSJ100s to the manufacturer.
Armavia then avoided further deliveries.

In February 2013, Sukhoi stated teething problems are usual in new airliners.

The SSJ entered service with Mexican Interjet on 18 September 2013; in their first four weeks, the first two aircraft operated were flown 580 times over 600 hours with a daily utilisation of 9.74 hours and a dispatch reliability of 99.03%.

By June 2014, Interjet had received seven SSJ100s and the dispatch reliability had increased to 99.7%.
On 12 September 2014, Interjet started regular passenger flights to the US, on the Monterrey, Mexico, – San Antonio, Texas, route.

On 3 June 2016, the Irish carrier CityJet was the first western European airline to take delivery of an SSJ100.

Dependability 

On 24 December 2016, the Russian Federal Air Transport Agency grounded seven jets after a tail component of an IrAero SSJ100 showed metal fatigue, leading Sukhoi to inspect the entire fleet. By 27 December, all aircraft had been inspected and it had been shown that the defect was not systemic as it featured multiple redundancies and a safety margin doubling the normal loads. Interjet grounded half of its fleet of SSJ100s during this period, but all of its aircraft were returned to service by the first week of January 2017 after Sukhoi sent 22 technicians to repair the grounded aircraft.

In June 2017, dispatch reliability increased to 97.85% from 96.94% a year earlier, while there were 89.6 malfunctions per 1,000 flight-hours, down by 40%.
On 21 July 2017, following the discovery of horizontal stabiliser rear spar cracks, the EASA mandated compulsory inspections. Sukhoi recognises it needs to improve customer support with more responsiveness and availability for flight training, engineering and spare parts supply. In early November 2017, the Russian Federal Air Transport Agency and Italian Civil Aviation Authority (ENAC) amended their bilateral airworthiness agreement, hitting SSJ export sales. Interjet claimed its capital cost for 10 Superjets was equivalent to the pre-delivery payment for one Airbus A320.
The pre-delivery payment amounts to 15-30% of an aircraft list price.
An A320 list price was $88.3M in 2012.

In January 2018, Bloomberg reported that four of Interjet's 22 SSJ100s were being cannibalised for parts to keep others running after having been grounded for at least five months because of SaM146 maintenance delays. This was later refuted by Interjet. One grounded SSJ100 was due to be back in service on 19 January 2018 and the remaining three in March. In August 2018, Russian regional carrier Yakutia Airlines considered withdrawing their SSJs, after two were grounded because their engines were removed after 1,500-3,000 cycles, below the 7,000 specified, and no replacements were available.
PowerJet was expanding its repair capacity and lease pool as engine maturity improved, noting that the SaM146 engine achieved 99.9% dependability since its 2011 introduction.

Productivity 
In September 2018, Interjet was reported to be considering replacing its SSJ100s with Airbus A320neos, to make better use of its slots, with the SSJ technical problems possibly also a factor.
On 12 September, Interjet denied the report.
It was later reported that Interjet intends to phase out some of its Superjets and take 20 more A320neos, maybe alongside newer Superjet deliveries; it will have access to an enhanced SSJ spares inventory in Mexico City and is installing a flight simulator in Toluca.
The updated SSJs would have winglets, a higher MTOW and improved systems and interior.
While the airline was attracted by its low introductory price, Sukhoi was forced to reimburse Interjet in 2018 after its fleet of 30 suffered persistent faults.

In October 2018, Sukhoi and engine contractor UEC agreed on a plan, backed by the Russian government, to focus on customer support rather than deliveries in order to improve dispatch reliability.
At the end of November 2018, United Aircraft Corporation transferred  from Sukhoi Holding to the Irkut Corporation, to become UAC's airliner division. By then, Brussels Airlines was seeking alternatives for its four SSJ100s wet-leased from CityJet, as teething problems affected their reliability.

By February 2019, CityJet's remaining five SSJ100s stood idle and were expected to be transferred to Slovenia's Adria Airways, which committed for 15 in late 2018, though Adria subsequently cancelled its order in April 2019. Neither CityJet nor Brussels Airlines have commented as to why they dropped the SSJ, though low reliability, difficult maintenance and spare parts availability are suspected to have contributed.

By the end of the first quarter of 2019, 15 of Interjet's 22 SSJs were out of service. Further talks with Sukhoi were deadlocked, with Interjet reportedly unwilling to pay for repairs to the PowerJet SaM146 engines. Interjet's reliability issues are compounded by the lack of service facilities in the Americas for the SSJ, a factor which also contributed to the poor reliability recorded by CityJet,

On 15 May 2019, Interjet announced that it is to sell its 20 SSJs, of which only five are operational, as it is no longer profitable to operate aircraft of this size in Mexico. Therefore, Sukhoi has had trouble selling the Superjet and renewing leasing contracts outside of Russia because of reliability and service network issues, resulting in an average of 109 flight hours per month for Russian airlines, approximately half the Embraer EMB 170 productivity, and just a third of a Boeing or Airbus jet. Unease with the SSJ's low reliability also spread to Russian operators.

Slow sales 
Sukhoi delivered only three SSJs in the first half of 2019; its financial results show a sevenfold drop in aircraft sales revenue and a fourfold drop in overall sales revenue, resulting in a 32% increase in its net loss. The company needs to achieve a production rate of 32 to 34 aircraft per year to make a profit, though demand for Russian models in the 60–120 seat category is forecast to be only 10 aircraft per year over a 20-year period. In the short-term, the company's main hope is that Aeroflot will firm up its 2018 preliminary agreement for 100 SSJs.

Yamal Airlines, the second-largest Russian SSJ operator, announced the cancellation of its order for 10 further SSJs, citing high servicing costs. Of 30–40 SSJs owned by Aeroflot, only 10 are reportedly usable at a time due to maintenance problems. Aeroflot cancelled approximately 50 Superjet flights in the week following the Flight 1492 accident. Kommersant cited industry sources as saying the Superjet 100 had lower dispatch reliability than Airbus and Boeing aircraft in the airline's fleet historically and attributed a rise in cancellations to "increased safety measures" at Aeroflot while the accident is investigated. On 4 June, the Russian Federal Air Transport Agency (Rosaviatsiya) ordered carriers to perform one-time inspections of the SSJ, including a general check of the aircraft's condition and verification of aircraft and engine logs, by 25 June.

A total of 12 jets were delivered in 2020 to the following operators: Rossiya Airlines, Azimuth Airlines, Red Wings Airlines.
The sole remaining western operator, Interjet, down by the end of November 2020 to just four operational SSJ100s, quit flying in December 2020 and entered bankruptcy in April 2021.  Part of Interjet’s plan was to try to return its 22 SSJ-100s to Sukhoi to cancel its debt, and resume flying with 10 Airbus A320 aircraft.
In December 2020, Rossiya Airlines announced that it intends to operate 66 Superjets by the end of 2021, transferred from its parent company Aeroflot which currently has 54 SSJs.

Variants 
Three variants were initially planned, seating 60, 78 and 98 passengers: the RRJ-60, RRJ-75 and RRJ-95, respectively. By 2007, the RRJ-60 had been dropped, to focus on the 98-seater, with the 78-seater to follow.
The RRJ-95B100 takeoff distance is reduced by 10%.

130–140 seat stretch 
In 2011, the Russian Ministry of Industry and Trade mentioned the stretched Superjet 130NG, seating 130.
It would have an aluminium fuselage and composite wings. The new materials were intended to reduce weight by 15-20%, increase service life by 20–30% and reduce operating costs by 10–12%.

In 2013, funding was planned to start in 2016 for production from 2019 to 2020. It would have used a derivative of the Irkut MC-21 composite wing and Pratt & Whitney PW1000G engines. The 130-seat stretch would have been known as the Sukhoi Superjet 130NG. It would have competed with the Airbus A220 and Embraer E-Jet E2 family.

115–120 seat stretch 
In 2016, a shorter stretch seating up to 120, using larger wings but the same engines and tail, was planned for introduction in 2020.
In 2017, with a business plan for 150 aircraft, a go-ahead for the NG 130-seat stretch depended on the availability of engines with sufficient thrust and was due by the end of the year.
The aircraft could carry up to 120 passengers with the existing engines, and up to 125 passengers with airframe continuous improvements; PowerJet could certify a thrust increase of 2% within three years. Sukhoi was to decide by the first quarter of 2018 whether to launch first a shortened 75-seat or a stretched variant needing higher thrust SaM146s or an alternative engine.

75 seat shrink 
At the February 2018 Singapore Air Show, Sukhoi announced a possible 75-seat shrink, to enter service in 2022.
With a smaller, optimised aluminium or composite wing, it would be powered by  Pratt & Whitney PW1200Gs, detuned SaM146s or Aviadvigatel PD-14 derived PD-7s.
The  shorter fuselage would be  lighter and it would fall within US scope clauses, but would require Western service and support experience.

Demand for such jets is 200–300 in Russia and up to 3,000 overseas; introduction could slip to early 2023.
As Sukhoi and Irkut may be consolidated into United Aircraft, some structures and avionics could be closer to the Irkut MC-21 for commonality.
A unified platform with identical controls would ease pilot conversions; S7 Airlines committed to 75 aircraft.
In July 2018, a composite wing was preferred and a 3-metre test section will be manufactured and tested. The variant would retain the SaM146 and empty weight should be reduced by 12–15%.

In 2018, serial production was planned for 2025, four years after design approval. By 2019, the priority had shifted to the replacement of Western parts on the SSJ100 so that the aircraft can be sold to US-sanctioned countries such as Iran. S7 Airlines, which had committed to 75 of the shortened aircraft, may seek alternatives from Bombardier or Embraer. In September 2019, the owner of S7, Vladislav Filev, confirmed his understanding that the SSJ75 project had been abandoned. He explained that S7 had insisted on the participation of its own experts in the test programme, and had demanded the replacement of the composite floor that showed insufficient fire resistance in the Sheremetyevo crash, together with a redesign of the wheel wells.

Orders and deliveries 

By August 2016, 133 SSJ100s were in operation with eight airlines and five governmental and business aviation organizations.
In October 2017, there were 105 SSJ100s in service worldwide: some used by government bodies such as the Royal Thai Air Force and Kazakh government agencies.
The fleet had logged 230,000 flights in 340,000 hours since its commercial operations debuted in 2011.
At least 30 SSJ100s were to be delivered in 2017, with 38 planned for 2018 and 37 for 2019. In May 2018, ten years after its first flight, the fleet of 127 have logged over 275,000 commercial flights and 420,000 hours. In September 2018, it had logged over 300,000 revenue flights lasting 460,000 hours.

Specifications

Accidents and incidents 

There have been three hull loss accidents and 86 deaths as of June 2019.
 On 9 May 2012, a demonstration flight directly struck Mount Salak in Indonesia, killing all 45 on board (Sukhoi personnel and representatives of various local airlines). The TAWS was ignored by the pilot, distracted by a conversation with a potential customer.
 On 21 July 2013, during autoland evaluation of an RRJ-95B (Russian experimental registry) with a single engine in a crosswind at Keflavík Airport in Iceland, the fuselage hit and slid down the runway with the gear up. During an intended go-around, the fatigued pilot throttled down the wrong engine, causing the aircraft to lose thrust sufficient for controlled flight. The plane continued to lose altitude and hit the runway even as the pilot realized his mistake and throttled up the engine. One of the five crew was injured during evacuation. The Icelandic Aircraft Accident Investigation Board investigated the event and issued nine recommendations.
 On 10 October 2018, a Yakutia Airlines SSJ100 slid off the runway at Yakutsk Airport as the main landing gear collapsed. All 87 passengers and five crew were safely evacuated and none were seriously injured. The excursion may have been caused by ice on the runway or the airstrip's poor state of repair. The airliner was damaged beyond repair and was expected to be written off.
 On 5 May 2019, as Aeroflot Flight 1492 was climbing after takeoff from Moscow Sheremetyevo, at  lightning discharged close to the aircraft from a nearby cumulonimbus cloud with a  base. The radio and other equipment failed, and the flight crew chose to make an emergency landing at Sheremetyevo. The aircraft bounced several times after an initial touchdown, and after the fourth hard touchdown a fire erupted and engulfed the rear of the aircraft. An emergency evacuation was then carried out but 41 out of 78 occupants died.

See also

Notes

References

External links 

 
 Unofficial production list and backlog
 
 Products of the Regional Aircraft-Branch of the Irkut Corporation

 
2000s Russian airliners
Twinjets
Low-wing aircraft
Aircraft first flown in 2008